Multipartite is a class of virus that have segmented nucleic acid genomes, with each segment of the genome enclosed in a separate viral particle. Only a few ssDNA viruses have multipartite genomes, but a lot more RNA viruses have multipartite genomes. An advantage of multipartite genome is its ability to synthesize multiple mRNA strands to avoid the cellular constraint of monocistronicity. Until recently, it was not known how multipartite viruses could efficiently infect a single cell with all the segments that comprise their genome simultaneously, which was thought to be necessary for replication. It has since been shown that the segments typically do not infect the same cell. Rather, segments accumulate in different cells and the viral system functions through exchange of material between cells. Thus, multipartite viruses are not localized in space but rather more like a distributed network of chemical reactions. In this sense, they are an even further departure from other organisms than monopartite viruses. Multipartite viruses represent 35-40% of the viral genera and families that have been described in plants and fungi, but otherwise appear to be rare.

See also
Monopartite

References

Genomics